Slope Records is a record label based in Sunnyslope, Arizona.

History

Phoenix-based Slope Records was formed in 2015 as an outlet to bring attention to selected bands and music. Initially, just a hobby for the founder, Thomas Lopez, Slope Records quickly evolved into a growing entity in the music business and featured an expanding list of artists creating new music, as well as an array of punk re-issues.

“Slope” refers to Sunnyslope, Arizona where the label's home offices are located. Sunnyslope is now part of central Phoenix, but was once the north edge of town. Part of the mission of Slope Records was to bring attention to the burgeoning Phoenix music scene through the re-release of classic Arizona punk rock bands as well as new releases by both Arizona and national acts.

Slope Records released Product of America by Exterminators on Election Day 2016, which was, at the time, the biggest release on the label. Exterminators are a Phoenix punk rock super group featuring Dan “Johnny Macho” Clark on vocals (Victory Acres, Feederz), Doug “Buzzy Murder” Clark on guitar (Mighty Sphincter), Don Bolles on drums (Germs, 45 Grave), and Cris Kirkwood (Meat Puppets) on bass. Other releases include work by Fuckemos, Nip Drivers, Mighty Sphincter, Surfbort, and Red Squares among others.

First wave Phoenix punk rock band Feederz signed with Slope Records in early February 2017. Frank Discussion, Clear Bob (Dan Clark/Johnny Macho from Exterminators), and DH Peligro (Dead Kennedys) reunited to create their socially and politically charged brand of Dadaist punk. Their initial Slope Records’ release was scheduled to come out in April 2017 featuring controversial cover art by Mike Fisher depicting United States President Donald Trump dressed as Adolf Hitler.

In September 2016, Slope Records began a relationship with skateboard legend and punk rock singer, Duane Peters. Since then, Peter's signed on with Slope and the label has released three 7” EPs by Peters. The first release from March 2017 featured Peters’ early 80s band, Political Crap, and contains three songs originally recorded for the 1981 compilation record, Who Cares (American Standard).

In March 2017 Slope Records started recording a full-length record with Moonlight Magic a Phoenix-based exotica band lead by Jaime Paul Lamb a local garage musician, archivist and Mason. After recording Moonlight Magic for the album titled Phoenixotica, Slope Records founder Thomas Lopez aka Tommy Blank and Jaime Paul Lamb aka Jaime Blank formed a project in October 2017 called The Blankz and recorded their first 7” titled White Baby.

Also released in April 2017, Phoenix, Arizona's The Father Figures who features a former member of Jody Foster's Army (JFA) as well as a member of North Side Kings and The Freeze joined Slope Records and the label released Heavy Lifting, which is the Post-skate punk bands’ fourth full-length record. “Like Fragile Porcelain Mice or Season to Risk, The Father Figures create music at once dissonant and melodically catchy. “USS Destroyer” is especially ear-wormy thanks to a shouted chorus. “Nigerian Prince Charming” is a modern update and mash-up between the Minutemen's “Take 5, D” and Nada Surf's “Popular,” melding a scam e-mail with political rhetoric and stop-and-go structure.”

During the summer of 2017, Slope Records released the TV’s OK EP by Austin, Texas band, The Cocky Bitches. The trio features Paul Leary of the Butthole Surfers as well as Sam McCandless of Cold and singer The Baroness.

In December 2017, Slope Records released two new 7” EPs from the US Bombs. The first of which is a tribute to The Clash with Peters and company providing their rendition of Clash favorites, “Death Or Glory” and “Straight To Hell.” The second EP features two brand new US Bombs songs, “Hollywood Gong Show” and “Midnight Run.” The US Bombs plan to tour extensively in 2018.

The Blankz released several EPs in 2018, including White Baby, (I Just Want To) Slam!, and I'm A Gun to overwhelmingly positive acclaim. ““…it’s these tunes that grab you, especially “White Baby”—as insanely catchy as Social Distortion's “1945,” No Alternative's “Johnny Got His Gun,” and The Controllers’ “Electric Church.” Lastly, Tommy Blank's exuberant vocals, and lyrics’ weighing his modern racial identity—a white kid raised by Mexicans—show smarts. It's a complete package,” wrote Jack Rabid from The Big Takeover.

Phoenix, Arizona via Cape Cod, Massachusetts punks The Freeze signed to Slope Records in 2018 as well with a brand-new record planned for early 2019. Along with The Father Figures, The Freeze represented Slope Records at the 2018 Punk Rock Bowling Festival as well.

In July 2018, the U.S. Bombs put the finishing touches on Road Case, which was their first full-length album in well over a decade. This was also the first LP for the Bombs on Slope Records and was released on November 23, 2018. The band will begin touring to support the record in December 2018 and continue on the road with the first leg of touring featuring Total Chaos as the support act.

The Cocky Bitches also put out a full-length LP on Slope Records in November 2018, as well. Mercy is the first LP by the band and was well received. “This is some high grade, weirdo, psych punk with some touches of lysergic blues of the highest order. In a way, it harkens back to Leary’s former band, but in a good way. It’s not a mere copy. He’s just taken the music that’s in his blood and, along with his collaborators, has created some inspired, twisted shit which is likely to put a smile on the face of anybody who likes their rock music way outside the box.”

During the late spring of 2019, Slope Records launched a new facet to their services by providing tour buses for bands, Anti-Nowhere League, The Dickies, Conflict, and The Exploited have all toured on the buses during 2019. The Linecutters supported Conflict on their brief US tour that culminated with a show at Punk Rock Bowling in Las Vegas. The Blankz also celebrated their live debut as they played Punk Rock Bowling opening for The Dickies and The Undertones.

Slope Records provided The Dickies with a tour bus for the first leg of their 2019 tour with The Queers, as well, celebrating the release of their first Slope Records 7” which featured a cover of the Cheap Trick song, “I Dig Go-Go Girls” featuring Monkey from The Adicts on side A and The Dickies own “The Dreaded Pigasaurus” as the B side. The release was joined in Slope Records summer release slate by Los Angeles, California’s Dead77 with their Slope debut, Astray, and The Linecutters’ Knuckledragger EP.

Following the release of their full-length LP, ‘Hate Your Life,’ The Besmirchers set out for a two-show leg of the Anti Nowhere League’s three US shows in 2019, which culminated in an arena performance at the Banc Stadium in Los Angeles. The Banc Stadium lineup consisted of Cro-Mags, ANWL, The Distillers, Rise Against, and the original lineup of The Misfits. The Besmirchers and ANWL had organized a longer 2020 tour, which was derailed due to the COVID-19 pandemic and subsequent shutdown measures. The tour was scheduled to kick off at Punk Rock Bowling featuring The Professionals, who formed following the dissolution of The Sex Pistols by founding members Steve Jones and Paul Cook. Unfortunately, this tour was also sidelined by pandemic shutdowns on live music venues and gatherings.

On Friday 13 December 2019, TSOL’s ‘Ghost Train’ EP became the legendary LA Punks first release on Slope Records. A culmination of their signature brooding goth, punk, and new wave blend anchored by lead singer Jack Grisham’s distinctive baritone, ‘Ghost Train,’ continues their renowned SoCal Punk legacy. TSOL’s roots are in the late 70’s LA Punk Scene, and they are considered one of the most influential and enduring bands of the genre. Pressed on translucent blue vinyl, ‘Ghost Train’ is informed by TSOL’s roots while bringing their sound into the 21st century.

Associated bands

 Surfbort
 FuckEmos
 Mighty Sphincter
 Our Neighbors Suck (ONS)
 The Christian Family
 Scorpion Vs Tarantula
 Useless Pieces of Shit (UPS)
 Mighty Sphincter
 Besmirchers
 Feederz		
 The Father Figures
 Red Squares
 The Bulemics
 The Scandals
 ManHands
 Nip Drivers
 Exterminators
 Insurrection
 Freaks of Nature
 The Brainz
 Sad Kid
 The Linecutters
 Political Crap
 Dead 77
 The Freeze
 The Cocky Bitches
 U.S. Bombs
 Duane Peters Gunfight
 The Blankz

Discography

Gallery

References

External links
Official website

Record labels established in 2015
American independent record labels
Record labels based in Arizona
Punk record labels